Married to the Army: Alaska is an American reality television series that follows the lives of seven military wives living in Alaska. The series premiered on Oprah Winfrey Network on Sunday November 18, 2012 at 10/9c.

Premise
OWN describes the concept behind the series: "Alaska is home to more than 10,000 active-duty soldiers, about 7,000 of whom were deployed to Afghanistan over the past two years.  The war in Iraq may be over, but it continues in Afghanistan and for those families whose loved ones are still gone, life during deployment is challenging, especially in Alaska, an assignment the military considers as demanding as an overseas post.  For the men and women whose spouses serve in the U.S. Army, deployment is not just an abstract word heard on the evening news.

It's real, it’s tough and it turns their world upside down.  Military wives find themselves in a unique sisterhood.  The tightest of bonds are formed over fears of deployment, realities of Army life and the emotional roller coaster of homecomings – all set against the backdrop of the rugged, demanding and extreme conditions of Alaska."

Cast
Yolanda Goins
Blair Flanagan
Lindsey Bergeron: 
Rynn Randall
Salina Tillman
Sara Dunlap
Traci Moran

Episodes

References

External links
 
 

2010s American reality television series
2012 American television series debuts
2012 American television series endings
Oprah Winfrey Network original programming
English-language television shows